Oklahoma Baptist University (OBU) is a private Baptist university in Shawnee, Oklahoma. It was established in 1910 under the original name of The Baptist University of Oklahoma. OBU is owned and was founded by the Baptist General Convention of Oklahoma.

History
Prior to the creation of the Baptist University of Oklahoma by the Baptist General Convention of Oklahoma in 1910, several other Baptist-affiliated schools were started in Oklahoma Territory. Oklahoma Baptist College in Blackwell began operation on September 4, 1901. The school fought financial problems throughout its history and closed in 1913. In the fall of 1907, the Baptists of Hastings, Oklahoma, Comanche County, Oklahoma and Mullins Baptist Associations opened Hastings Baptist College in the southwestern part of the state. A year later, the name was changed to Southwest Baptist College and then to Southwest Baptist Academy. It suffered similar financial challenges and ceased operation in 1912. Baptists in nearby Mangum were able to pay off debts of Southwest Baptist College and move the school to their city. It was reopened in the fall of 1912 in the First Baptist Church building and was called Southwestern Baptist College, then Western Baptist College. It was closed in 1915.

A commission to plan the founding of a Baptist university in Oklahoma was established by the Baptist Convention in 1906 (one year prior to Oklahoma statehood) while in session in Shawnee. At the second annual meeting of the Baptist General Convention of Oklahoma (BGCO) at Ardmore in November 1907, the Baptist Education Commission unanimously passed a resolution stating its sense that "as soon as practicable a new Baptist University be established". A board of trustees was elected soon thereafter in 1907. A site for the university was sought, and from 1908–1909 negotiations were held with entities in El Reno, Lawton, Chickasha and Oklahoma City without reaching agreeable terms.

At the 1910 annual meeting of the BGCO in Enid, the trustees reported that Shawnee had been selected as the site of the new university and that an incorporation certificate for "the Baptist University of Oklahoma" had been issued by the State of Oklahoma on February 9, 1910. The school's Board of Trustees then signed an agreement with the City of Shawnee for sixty acres of land northwest of the town. The Kickapoo site, as the campus location became known, was deeded to the university by the Development Company of Shawnee. Shortly after the campus location was finalized, W.P. Blake, chairman of the trustees, and G. Lee Phelps, missionary to the Native Americans, visited the future building site. They gathered and arranged twelve stones, commemorating God's leadership of the Israelites across the Jordan River into the Promised Land.

Plans for the administration building had been drawn and a contract for construction of the building had been signed on June 3, 1910. The total estimated cost to construct, equip, and furnish the building was $140,000. The trustees reported that the City of Shawnee "through its development company, gave to the denomination sixty acres of land worth $1,000 per acre and a cash bonus of $100,000".  Dr. J.M. Carroll, San Marcos, Texas, was selected as the school's first president and construction on an administration building commenced in February 1911.

The university opened in September 1911, holding classes for 150 students in the basement of the First Baptist Church and in the Convention Hall of Shawnee. Students came from other universities and preparatory schools, and at the close of the 1911–12 school year nine students received degrees. Included in the first student body were three men who later served as United States Senators: Josh Lee and Robert S. Kerr of Oklahoma and Huey P. Long of Louisiana.

A general depression in the State in 1911 however had a negative effect on the finances of the BGCO, as well as the development company that had promised the $100,000 cash bonus, which it was unable to deliver, and construction on the Administration Building was halted. After the completion of the first school year in 1912 Dr. Carroll resigned and recommended that operations of the school be temporarily suspended. His recommendation was adopted and the university was placed in a period of "suspended animation" while further organization and fund-raising progressed. The report submitted by the Board of Trustees to the BGCO annual meeting in 1914 discussed the need for completion of the construction of the administration building and recommended the convention "begin at once to provide for the equipment of the building and make other necessary provisions for the opening of school in September, 1915".  Frank M. Masters, pastor of the First Baptist Church of Ardmore and a member of the BGCO's Education Commission, was selected by the school's Board of Trustees as the president who would re-open the university.  The Administration Hall (renamed Shawnee Hall in the 1920s) was finally completed in September 1915 in time for the re-opening.

The university reopened for the fall 1915 semester with a total enrollment of 143; with about a third of them ministerial students. OBU has been in continual operation in Shawnee since that time. The name of the university was officially changed to "The Oklahoma Baptist University" in 1920.

In 1915, Shawnee Hall housed faculty, staff, classrooms, library, an auditorium which doubled as a gymnasium, and the women's dormitory. Shawnee Hall did not house male students, as they were housed in two privately owned off-campus homes, known as "Hill Hall" (located half of a block south of the intersection of Kickapoo and MacArthur streets) and "Douglas Hall" (located on south University street where Bailey Business Center now stands). Shawnee Hall did not provide enough space for women's housing, therefore, in 1916 ground was broken on a new dormitory for women. The new residential unit was opened in 1917 and named Montgomery Hall, in honor of Dr. and Mrs. D.M. Montgomery, who provided significant financial support for the project. Montgomery Hall served as a dormitory, the fine arts center, the student center, and the location for administrative services. The original Montgomery Hall was located between Shawnee Hall and WMU Memorial Dormitory on the campus oval. The building was removed in 1989 due to structural concerns and a new Montgomery Hall was located on south University street west of the Bailey Business Center.  From 1919 to 1928, campus facilities consisted of three buildings, Shawnee Hall, Montgomery Hall, and the combination men's dormitory and gymnasium. In the mid 1920s under the leadership of Berta K. Spooner; Executive Secretary-Treasurer of the Oklahoma Women's Missionary Union, Baptist women of Oklahoma recognized the need for a new dormitory for women on Oklahoma Baptist University's campus. After a fundraising effort to procure sufficient financial support for the new dormitory, groundbreaking occurred in 1927 for the new facility. When WMU Memorial Dormitory opened in 1928, the building housed rooms for 200 female students, the university dining hall, parlors, assembly rooms, a recreation room, an infirmary, and a swimming pool. Due to the challenges of "The Great Depression" in the late 1920s to the 1930s, it would be another decade before another building was constructed on campus.

Oklahoma Baptist University served as an army aviation training site from February 1943 through the summer of 1944, hosting the 91st College Training Detachment. Cadets lived in WMU Dormitory, attended classes in Shawnee Hall, drilled on the campus oval, and exercised on the athletic fields. During the time of the U.S. Army attachment during World War II, approximately 2,000 cadets were trained during the sixteen months of OBU retaining military detachment. According to John Wesley Raley, OBU's president during that time, "OBU's participation in the military program provided several benefits: Satisfaction that the university had participated in the war effort; favorable advertising through the cadets who had been on campus; the ability to maintain a strong faculty, despite the decline in regular enrollment which had dropped to 326 in 1943, the smallest enrollment since 1918; the maintenance and enlargement of the physical plant; and operating without a deficit during a 'most difficult period for colleges'". Although the university participated in the war effort during World War II, the university does not have an active ROTC program at this present time.

Total annual enrollment in the university exceeded 1,000 for the first time in 1946. OBU was officially racially integrated in 1955, when the Board of Trustees approved a motion by Dr. Herschel H. Hobbs, pastor of Oklahoma City's First Baptist Church, to allow African American students admission to the university.

In January 1964, during final examinations week, the school narrowly missed disaster when a man flew a small airplane into Shawnee Hall. The man had been hospitalized for mental health problems but had been released and was able to rent a plane in Tulsa. He radioed the Shawnee airport and reported that he was going to fly his plane into OBU's administration building. Authorities evacuated Thurmond Hall, which had been the university's administration building since 1954, and moved students to Shawnee Hall, the primary classroom building. Shawnee Hall had been the administration building prior to 1954. The pilot then flew his plane into one of the few empty classrooms in the building and when the plane crashed into room 307, the students made a calm and orderly exit. The pilot was killed and the exterior impact area along with two classrooms were badly damaged. None of the 300 students, faculty, or other staff were injured. Today, Shawnee Hall bears the scars of this incident. Although all damage has been repaired, the brick and mortar on the south side of the building is discolored in one area on the third floor when Shawnee Hall is viewed from the campus oval.

Enrollment passed 2,000 for the first time in 1989 and a record enrollment of 2,440, with 2,011 on campus, was set in 1994. Under President Mark Brister, by 2005, the university's endowment exceeded US$80 million. In 2007, OBU's International Graduate School opened in Oklahoma City, offering a master's of business administration degree.

The university was granted an exception to Title IX in 2014 which allows it to legally discriminate against LGBT students for religious reasons. A student LGBT group called Bison 4 Equality protested the Title IX exemption. It was also ranked among the "Absolute Worst Campuses for LGBTQ Youth" in the US by Campus Pride in 2021.

Presidents

 James M. Carroll, 1910–1912
 Frank M. Masters, 1915–1919
 Judson A. Tolman, 1919–1921
 John B. Lawrence, 1922–1926
 Warren W. Phelan, 1926–1930
 William Cooke Boone, 1930–1932
 Hale Virginus Davis, 1932–1934
 John Wesley Raley, 1934–1961
 James R. Scales, 1961–1965
 Grady C. Cothen, 1966–1970
 Robert Lynn (interim), 1971
 William G. Tanner, 1972–1976
 E. Eugene Hall, 1977–1982
 Tom Terry (interim), 1982
 Bob Agee, 1982–1998
 Mark Brister, 1998–2007
 John W. Parrish (interim), 2007–2008
 David W. Whitlock 2008–2018
 C. Pat Taylor (Interim) 2018–2018
 Dr. Heath Thomas January 2020 – Present

Academics

Graduate degrees
OBU offers two graduate degrees through the OBU Graduate School, based in downtown Oklahoma City.

On February 20, 2012, The OBU Graduate School announced plans to relocate from Oklahoma City's Triangle District to the Baptist General Convention of Oklahoma building, located at 3800 N. May Avenue in Oklahoma City, in May 2012. The Graduate School has been located in the Momentum Building at 111 N. Harrison in downtown Oklahoma City since January 2007. The move will not affect the time frame of the existing cohorts in the Graduate School's programs. Dr. Scott Harris, director of the OBU Graduate School, cited the reasoning behind the move as more classroom space for existing and future programs, easier access in Oklahoma City concerning location (near Interstate 44 and Lake Hefner Parkway), and other educational endeavors.

Colleges and divisions
 College of Arts and Sciences: Division of Language & Literature, Division of Behavioral & Social Sciences, Division of Science & Mathematics, Division of Kinesiology & Leisure Studies, Division of Teacher Education
 Herschel H. Hobbs College of Theology and Ministry 
 Paul Dickinson School of Business
 School of Nursing
 Warren M. Angell College of Fine Arts: Division of Music, Division of Communication Arts, Division of Art & Design
 OBU Graduate School

Undergraduate core curriculum 
In addition to courses on the Bible and in science, all students take courses in OBU's distinctive Western Civilization sequence, which includes a Freshman-level course on ancient Greek literature and culture and then the sophomore-level, twelve credit hour, team-taught courses on the history and literature of the Western world from the Roman republic to today. The purpose of the Western Civilization sequence has been stated by faculty member, Dr. Benjamin Myers: "Knowledge of Western civilization—a true knowledge of its change and continuity over time—gives the student room to breathe intellectually, morally, spiritually, and emotionally. It frees the student from the tyranny of the moment, from merely fashionable, inevitably superficial ways of being in the world. Life in the fullness of time is a life more abundant than living in the prison of the moment."

Campus

Location
OBU is located in northwest Shawnee, Oklahoma. The campus is bordered by N. Kickapoo Street to the east, W. Midland Street to the south and N. Airport Drive to the west. W. McArthur Street runs through the north side of the campus, with the main campus lying south of the street and residential and athletic areas to the north.

In December 2018 the sale to Hobby Lobby of the Shawnee campus of the bankrupt St. Gregory's University, located at 1900 West MacArthur, was approved by the bankruptcy court.  The campus, less than a mile to the west along MacArthur from the main OBU campus, was leased to OBU. In May 2019, OBU renamed the former St. Gregory's property the "OBU Green Campus" both in honor of the Green family, owners of Hobby Lobby, and in reference to the color green, one of the university's official colors.  In December 2019, Hobby Lobby and the Green family donated the campus to OBU.  The former St. Gregory’s Abbey and College campus is on the National Register of Historic Places listings in Pottawatomie County, Oklahoma.

Major buildings
Major campus buildings include the Art Building, Bailey Business Center, Ford Music Hall, Geiger Center, Jent Alumni Center, Mabee Learning Center (composed of a renovation of and an addition to the university's former library building, W.L. Brittain Hall, and the faculty office building, Owens Hall), Montgomery Hall, the Noble Complex, John Wesley Raley Chapel, Andrew Potter Auditorium, Shawnee Hall (the original 1915 administration building), Stubblefield Chapel (erected in 1894 and moved to the campus in 1963), Sarkeys Telecommunication Center, Thurmond Hall, the W.P. Wood Science Building, and—on the OBU Green Campus—Benedictine Hall.

Art Building
Refurbished in 2001, the Art Building is located at the northwest corner of Kickapoo and Midland Streets. The refurbished art facility includes two faculty offices, an art gallery, photography lab, a general classroom, a computer graphics art lab, a weaving and stained glass lab, and a ceramics lab. The art department also uses a facility adjacent to the art building to house drawing and studio art classes.

Bailey Business Center
Constructed in 1993, the  building on University Drive directly south of the campus oval is named in honor of William S. Bailey, a Tulsa philanthropist and business director.

Ford Music Hall

Constructed in 1951, the building is located on south University Drive directly west of Gold Star Park, southeast of the campus oval.

Geiger Center
Constructed in 1970, the Geiger Center is located east of Raley Chapel and north of Kerr Residence Center. The center was originally named "University Center" until 1982, when the building was renamed the "Albert J. and Laura Belle Geiger Center for University Life".

On-campus dining is provided in the Laura Scales Cafeteria, located in the upper level of the Geiger Center.  Coffee and quick service dining is available at Java City and the Geiger Counter, located in the lower level of the Geiger Center. The Geiger Center also houses the mailroom, copy center, OBU Bookstore, meeting rooms, special dining areas and information desk, as well as a prayer room. The offices of the Dean of Students, Events/Camps/Conferences Director, Director of Residential Life and Campus Activities, Student Government Association and the Student Services Center are located in the Geiger Center. The Student Services Center includes Career Planning Services, Testing Services, Special Services, Counseling Services, and Student Health Services.

Jent Alumni Center
Constructed in 1937, the building was named for John W. Jent, an early OBU administrator and philosophy professor. It originally was an apartment building for faculty, known as "Jent Apartments". Sometime after World War II, it later became a dormitory for male students and in 1988, it became the "Jent Alumni Center", which houses development and alumni offices.

Mabee Learning Center

In 1918, work began on a combination men's dormitory and gymnasium and the building was completed in 1919. Most of the dormitory was located on the east end of the building, now known as Owens Hall. The gymnasium was used until 1941, when a new gymnasium was opened. The old gymnasium was converted into the W.L. Brittain Learning Center in 1946, and in 1976, became a part of the Mabee Learning Center.

The university's primary library is located in the Mabee Learning Center (MLC).  The collection of resources contains more than 184,724 bound volumes, 534,429 microform holdings and approximately 10,050 other media materials. The Learning Center also subscribes to several online indexes (Psyc. Info, MLA Bibliography, CINAHL, ATLA Religion Index, WorldCat, etc.) and full-text databases (EbscoHost, Academic Elite, Literature Resource Center, Biography Resource Center, InfoTrac Expanded Academic, NetLibrary, NewsBank, Electric Library, General Business File ASAP, Health Reference Center-Academic, etc.). It also subscribes to 450 print periodical/newspaper titles. The MLC is a United States government documents depository.  Also located in the MLC is the Herschel Hobbs Baptist History and Heritage Center, containing the personal library, manuscripts, and memorabilia of Dr. and Mrs. Herschel Hobbs. Other archival collections include the B.B. McKinney music collection, the E.C. Routh Library of Missions, and the J.W. Storer collection related to the American Civil War and World War II.

Owens Hall is also located on the east side of Mabee Learning Center. When the new gymnasium was constructed in 1941, Owens Hall, still a men's dormitory, was added to the gymnasium that was remodeled as W.L. Brittain Library. In the 1970s, Owens Hall was remodeled from a dormitory into faculty offices, which is what the building addition is now.

Montgomery Hall
Constructed in 1989, the building is named for Dr. and Mrs. D.M. Montgomery. The building is located west of the Bailey Business Center on south University Drive, south of the campus oval. The building replaced the earlier Montgomery Hall, which was constructed in 1917 southwest of Shawnee Hall on the campus oval. Due to structural problems, that building was demolished in March 1989; it was replaced with the current Montgomery Hall, which houses a campus ministry center and various classrooms.

Dr. John Wesley Raley Chapel
As a result, the chapel's spire can be seen from several miles away on a clear day and is usually used as a symbol of OBU. The chapel was named in honor of Dr. John Wesley Raley, longest serving president of OBU, from 1934 to 1961, then serving as Chancellor of OBU, until his death in 1968.

Raley Chapel is home to two separate auditoriums. The Andrew Potter Auditorium has a seating capacity of 2,000 and features the 56-rank Van Deren Memorial Organ. On the lower floor, the W.R. Yarborough Memorial Auditorium seats 400. The Mabee Fine Arts Center in Raley Chapel houses music classrooms, studios, rehearsal rooms, and the office of the Dean of the College of Fine Arts. Among the instruments in Raley Chapel is the McGavern Harpsichord, a two-manual French instrument constructed in 1974.

Along with the auditoriums, there are several classrooms on the northern side of Raley Chapel, including a small banquet hall named in honor of Helen Thames Raley, wife of Dr. John Wesley Raley.

On December 21, 2011, work began on the windows in the spire of Raley Chapel. AT&T reached an agreement with OBU to install a cell phone antenna in the chapel's spire. The existing glass and aluminum framing could potentially interfere with the antenna transmission, leading to the replacement project.

Shawnee Hall

Construction began on Shawnee Hall in 1911, but was not completed until 1915, when the school re-opened from its "suspended animation" period. The building was named in honor of the city of Shawnee, who donated the original  and a $100,000 cash bonus to the university. It was originally the administration building until 1954, when Thurmond Hall was constructed. Shawnee Hall occupies the northernmost point of the campus oval and houses classrooms.  It also houses the Cleo L. Craig-Rhetta May Dorland Theatre, commonly called the Craig-Dorland Theatre, which was renovated in 2002 and houses OBU Theatre's main stage season productions.

Stubblefield Chapel
Stubblefield Chapel, named for Cortez Stubblefield (1848–1930), early Oklahoma Baptist pastor and 20-year associate to Oklahoma Baptist University, is located on south University Drive, southeast of Kerr Residence Hall, and directly west of Montgomery Hall.

The building, originally the First Christian Church of Shawnee until 1953, was the first meeting house of Shawnee's First Baptist Church and was first erected at 207 N. Union Street in downtown Shawnee. Baptist General Convention of Indian Territory (formed in Tahlequah in 1883), antecedent to present Baptist General Convention of Oklahoma, met in this building for its final session on November 9, 1906, and merged with Oklahoma Baptist State Convention (Oklahoma Territory) later that same day to found the Baptist General Convention of Oklahoma.

The chapel was re-located to its current location on OBU campus in the fall of 1963 and formally dedicated by the senior class of 1964 to the university on February 20, 1964, OBU Founder's Day.

Because of its picturesque nature, colorful stained-glass windows, and seating accommodations, it has become a popular building in which to conduct weddings, banquets, and other ceremonies.

Sarkeys Telecommunication Center

Located directly north of the Geiger Center, this building opened in 1941 as the "University Gymnasium". It was the home of the basketball team until the opening of Bison Fieldhouse in 1948. From 1948 on, the building was used as an intramural gymnasium, auditorium, theater annex, and physical education locale until 1986, when it was heavily remodeled. The building, now known as Sarkeys Telecommunication Center, houses classrooms, conference rooms, and offices.  It is also the home of the Sarkey’s Black Box Theatre, which is used for classroom showcases, rehearsal space, student lead events, intimate main-stage productions, and other campus events.   (This theatre is not to be confused with the Sarkeys Performing Arts Center on the OBU Green Campus.)

Thurmond Hall

Thurmond Hall was constructed in 1954 and is located on the northeast corner of the campus oval, southeast of Shawnee Hall. In 1987, Thurmond Hall was renovated to accommodate a computer lab and the Williamson School of Nursing. Thurmond Hall is the OBU Administration building that includes classrooms and a large computer lab.

W.P. Wood Science Building
The W.P. Wood Science Building was constructed in 1985 and is located on the southeast corner of the campus oval, north of the intersection of Kickapoo Street and University Drive. The building was named in honor of W.P. Wood, a Shawnee businessman. The lead gift of the building came from W.P. Wood Trusts. The building is composed of classrooms, the science department of OBU, and a chemistry lab.

Members of the OBU community celebrated groundbreaking for a new student residential village on May 10, 2012, during an afternoon ceremony. The total complex will include 204 new apartment units, 782 beds and 20 laundry facility-safe rooms on Bison Hill. OBU trustees, students, faculty, staff and Shawnee community representatives gathered for the ceremony at the site of the planned buildings, north of OBU's MacArthur Apartments on the north side of MacArthur Street. When completed, the proposed housing complex will include six large apartment buildings, one small apartment building and a centrally located clubhouse building attached to another large apartment building. The initial phase of the village construction includes two housing structures which feature contemporary apartment units to accommodate 194 students.
Each apartment unit will feature four individual bedrooms, two bathrooms and an open floor plan including a kitchen, dining area and living area. Some of the apartments will include a washer and dryer, while others will share laundry facilities on the first floor which also double as safe rooms to be used in severe weather threats.
OBU hired CJC Architects Inc., a Tulsa firm which has worked with the University on several major projects, to plan the construction of the complex. Occupancy of the first phase of the apartments is projected for the fall 2013 semester.
Nearly 100 individuals attended the groundbreaking activities. Representatives from the student body, the local community, OBU trustees, faculty, staff, and architect and construction representatives took turns shoveling dirt at the site.

Benedictine Hall
With the OBU Green Campus acquisition, OBU inherited Benedictine Hall.  Construction on the imposing, five-story, Tudor Gothic–style structure began in 1913.  The facility was damaged in 2011 by a 5.8 magnitude earthquake, but several million dollars in donations enabled the reconstruction of the building's towers.

Other facilities on the OBU Green Campus seeing at least occasional use are the Sarkeys Performing Arts Center (not to be confused with the Sarkeys Black Box Theatre in the Sarkeys Telecommunications Center on the main campus), and the Rockwood Center.

Monuments and sculptures
While many universities have monuments to commemorate certain events in their respective lore and history, OBU has acquired many monuments in its 100-year history. Some of these monuments are class memorials donated for the beautification of the campus and some are donated from private, outside groups and churches.
 The sundial and pergola in front of Shawnee Hall, gifts from the class of 1922, remain the first ever-recorded senior gifts from a graduating class.
 In 1927, the senior class donated and built a brick and mortar archway sidewalk entrance located on the northwest corner of Kickapoo and University Streets. The Class of 1954 donated and built another brick and mortar archway on the southwest corner of the intersection, completing the east entrance of the campus.
 The Class of 1932 donated the bison statue and pedestal that stand on the northern part of the campus oval, directly south of Shawnee Hall. The bison statue is painted gold and the pedestal is made of brick and mortar with several other small bison adornments and a granite plaque commemorating the Class of 1932..
 The Class of 1935 donated and began a rock wall on OBU at that time. The wall, at its largest, extended from where Kerr Residence Hall sits, heading east until bending north from the intersection of University Street and Kickapoo, heading west along the southern side of MacArthur Street, completing at its terminus near MacArthur Street and Airport Road. In 2010, portions of the wall had to come down as a result of the widening of Kickapoo Street. As of 2012, the only portion of the wall that remains standing is the segment along the north side of University Street. Along with the rock wall, the class also donated a group of hedges which when viewed from the intersection of Kickapoo and MacArthur Streets, the hedges spell out "OBU".
 In 1938, the senior class of that year donated and built a fountain at the center of the campus oval. However, over the many years, the fountain fell into disrepair and eventually stopped working altogether. In 1991, the senior class of that year decided to restore the fountain to its original state. Working in conjunction with surviving members of the Class of 1938, the senior class of 1991 was able to raise the needed funds for the campus oval fountain's restoration. As of 2012, the fountain is in perfect working order and lights are fitted inside the fountain so that when viewed at night it alternately glows green and gold.
 The Class of 1945's class project was to build a memorial to the members of the OBU family who had perished in World War II. On, May 24, 1945, "Gold Star Park" was dedicated to OBU from the Senior Class of 1945. The monument stands today directly east of Ford Music Hall southwest of the intersection of University and Kickapoo streets. On the memorial is an inscription that reads, "Honoring Bisons 'Who more than self their country loved and liberty than life'". Each year, U.S. Military veterans from OBU and elsewhere gather at "Gold Star Park" on the anniversary of the dedication of the memorial to lay a wreath and for the playing of "Taps". This World War II memorial is believed to be one of the earliest memorials constructed in the state.
 Although there is almost no physical trace on the OBU campus proper of the university's participation in training soldiers during World War II, there remains one noticeable artifact. East of the intersection of Franklin Street and Airport Road, directly north of the Eyer building, there are two 6-foot-tall concrete square columns that once served as the checkpoint for the U.S. Navy Air base, which now serves as Shawnee's airport. The square columns are painted red, white, and blue and are adorned with a frieze of a golden-painted eagle on a blue background on both east and west sides. As of today, the square columns serve as one of the few reminders of OBU and the city of Shawnee's participation in the war effort.
 In 1948, the charging bison roadside plaque at the Storer Lane entrance to the university, was installed. The small drive, located on the west side of the Agee Residential Center, is named for Dr. James Wilson Storer, receiver of an honorary doctorate in 1939. The monument itself is about 6.5 feet tall and is located near MacArthur Street on Storer Lane.
 In 1952, the quadrangle clocktower was erected directly west of Shawnee Hall. The clocktower is around 25 feet tall, made of brick, mortar, iron, and concrete, features water fountains (fountains not working), and a concrete frieze of a charging bison facing each cardinal direction. The class of 1994 restored the quadrangle clock tower and added park benches.
 In 1956, an outdoor bulletin board was added. This class gift now stands as brick benches outside of WMU Memorial Dormitory.
 In 1983, the Peitz Plaza, named for Lawrence Peitz, was dedicated. The plaza, located between Raley Chapel and the Geiger center, features two small fountains, a rock waterfall, urban-style park benches, and several small trees. In 2010, a life-sized fiberglass statue of a bison, which features a colorful display of various artworks painted on the statue, was added onto the plaza.
 The Class of 1993, donated a new sign at the corner of Kickapoo and MacArthur directly southwest of the "OBU Hedges".
 A gazebo and park, located directly west of Stubblefield Chapel, were added on University Drive by the Class of 1996, and the campus signage project was provided by the Class of 1997. The Class of 1998 built the legacy wall, and the Class of 1999 continued the campus signage project. The Class of 2000 created Millennium Park, north of the campus near Taylor Residence Center, and the Class of 2001 provided the marble cross in front of Raley Chapel.
 The class of 2002 began work on the Truth Walk project, which was completed in 2004. The project includes granite stones engraved with scriptures, located directly south of Shawnee Hall and north of the bison pedestal.
 On August 1, 2011, a  bronze statue of James R. Scales was dedicated on the Oklahoma Baptist University campus in his honor. The statue is located on the campus quadrangle, directly southwest of Shawnee Hall.

Residential life
OBU requires all unmarried students under 21 years of age to reside in university housing. The university operates two residence halls (Agee Residence Center and The Lodge) and three apartment complexes (East Devereaux, MacArthur and Midland) for men, and three residence halls (Woman's Missionary Union, Kerr, and Howard), one suite complex (Taylor) and apartment complexes (Howard Apartments, and West University) for women. Three apartment complexes are provided for married students (Burns, Cobbs and West Devereaux).

Athletics

The Oklahoma Baptist (OBU) athletic teams are called the Bison. The university is a member of the NCAA Division II ranks, primarily competing in the Great American Conference (GAC) since the 2015–16 academic year. They were also a member of the National Christian College Athletic Association (NCCAA), primarily competing as an independent in the Central Region of the Division I level.

Prior joining the NCAA, the Bison previously competed in the National Association of Intercollegiate Athletics (NAIA), primarily competing in the Sooner Athletic Conference (SAC) from 1978–79 to 2014–15; and in the Texoma Athletic Conference from 1973–74 to 1977–78.

OBU competes in 13 intercollegiate varsity sports: Men's sports include baseball, basketball, cross country, football and track and field; while women's sports include basketball, cross country, golf, soccer, softball, stunt, track & field and volleyball. Former sports included men's golf, women's lacrosse, men's soccer, men's & women's swimming, men's & women's tennis and women's cheerleading.

Championships
OBU has ten NAIA National Championships: men's basketball (1966 and 2010); men's outdoor track and field (1990 and 2007); women's indoor track and field (2005, 2007, 2010 and 2011); women's outdoor track and field (2012); men's swimming and diving (2012 and 2013); and women's swimming and diving (2013).

Move to NCAA Division II
As of July 11, 2014, the NCAA Division II Membership Committee recommended the membership application for the institution to set up the move from the NAIA to NCAA Division II, competing in the Great American Conference, effectively the 2015–16 season.

Facilities
 The Noble Complex
Completed in the summer of 1982, it is a  building which houses a 2,400-seat arena, the Mabee Suite, which accommodates events for up to 150 people, an athletic heritage center, and classrooms and offices for the division of kinesiology and leisure studies. Additionally, the Noble Complex houses a large varsity sports weight room.
 Basketball and volleyball
The Bison and Lady Bison basketball teams play home games along with the volleyball team in the Mabee Arena in the Noble Complex. Opened in 1982, the Noble Complex underwent a major renovation prior to the 2007–08 season, adding new locker rooms, basketball offices, court-side wireless Internet, the Mabee Suite, and new scoreboards. The Mabee Arena seats around 2,400 people, including chair-back seating in the lower reserved sections.
 Soccer
The Bison and Lady Bison soccer teams play at the OBU Soccer Complex, located north of the main campus on Raley Drive. The OBU pitch includes bleacher seating and covered dugouts. In addition to the main pitch, the complex includes a practice field.
 Baseball
In 2008, the Bison baseball team relocated to "Bison Field at Ford Park", located on the north side of campus at the end of Raley Drive. The field was named in honor of J. Lloyd Ford, founder of the Shawnee Milling Company, and the Ford family, which has long ties to the university. The field includes covered dugouts, fenced outfield bullpens, a pressbox, and metal bleachers on a concrete slab. There is also a Junior Varsity field located to the southwest of the Coates Baseball/Softball Building, where the baseball team is lockered and officed.
 Softball
Lady Bison Softball Field, at the north end of Raley Drive, includes metal outfield fences, scoreboard, press box, covered dugouts, a covered patio, bleacher seating on a concrete slab, public restrooms, storage area and an umpire dressing room. The Lady Bison have lockers and offices in the Coates Building, which also includes an indoor hitting facility.
 Swimming and diving
The men's and women's OBU Natatorium was an Olympic-size swimming pool located in the Noble Complex and was used for swim and dive meets and swim lessons for children, along with general swimming. The pool was temperature controlled and utilized a salt water chlorination system.
 Tennis
The OBU Tennis Complex includes eight courts on University Street, south of the Recreation and Wellness Center. The courts were professionally resurfaced in the summer of 2011. The university plans to create a new tennis complex in the near future near the soccer fields.
 Track

Oklahoma Baptist University opened its new track, the Eddie Hurt Jr. Memorial Track, just west of the old track in 2008. The track hosted the 2008 Sooner Athletic Conference Championships and is being improved daily. The track and field and cross country teams are housed in the Jay P. Chance Track Building, at the northeast corner of the intersection of University Street and Airport Road.
 Recreation and Wellness Center (RAWC)
The OBU Recreation and Wellness Center, home to the department of Bison Recreation and Wellness, (RAWC, pronounced "rock") was completed in 2007 and includes cardio and weight machines, a  rock climbing wall, an indoor running track, three basketball-volleyball courts, three racquetball courts and a lounge. The RAWC serves the entire campus body in the ways of recreations and Wellness activities and opportunities.  The facility is also home to the intramural and club sports programs, which include basketball, bowling, Flag Football, Free Throw Shooting, racquetball, Sand Volleyball, softball, tennis, volleyball, and Ultimate Frisbee.

 Clark Craig Fieldhouse
Located where the RAWC is at the present time, Clark Craig Fieldhouse originally served as a military recreational facility at Camp Maxey in Paris, Texas, during World War II. It was purchased, moved, and reconstructed on the OBU campus in 1948.  Clark Craig Fieldhouse was the home of the Bison basketball team during the years the team reached three successive NAIA championship games, winning the national title in 1966. The teams moved into the OBU Noble Complex's Mabee Arena beginning in the 1982–83 season and Clark Craig was used primarily for intramurals and as an indoor training facility for OBU's spring sports.
After years of athletic services, Clark Craig Fieldhouse was in deteriorating condition and on January 26, 2006, Clark Craig Fieldhouse was demolished to make way for the RAWC.

Recent sports at OBU
On December 16, 2010, Oklahoma Baptist University president David Whitlock announced that football, lacrosse, and varsity swimming teams would be added to the list of athletics. Beginning with swimming and lacrosse in 2012, and football in the fall semester of 2013, the number of intercollegiate sports played at Oklahoma Baptist University is 21 sports, 10 men's teams and 11 women's teams. This marks the first time since 1940 that Oklahoma Baptist University has fielded a football team.

On January 18, 2012, OBU announced the hiring of Chris Jensen to become head coach of the university's revitalized football program. Jensen comes to OBU from Southmoore High School, where he started the football program in 2008. In his and the program's second year, the SaberCats were 11–2 and reached the Class 6A semifinals. Jensen was named Oklahoma 6A-1 Coach of the Year in 2009. Jensen's coaching stops also include assistant posts at Westmoore (defensive coordinator), Bartlesville (offensive coordinator), Durant (offensive coordinator and assistant head coach), Moore (offensive line) and Little Axe (offensive line and outside linebackers).

Rivalries
Oklahoma Baptist University has several rivals throughout the Sooner Athletic Conference (SAC). Before the closure of St. Gregory's University, which was about a mile west from Oklahoma Baptist University on MacArthur Street in Shawnee, OBU had a rivalry with that school. As a result of the religious affiliations of both universities (St. Gregory's being a Roman Catholic institution), some sports writers referred to the athletic contests as "The Holy War on MacArthur Street". Although considered to be more of a basketball rivalry, the rivalry spilled into other sports such as baseball and soccer.

Traditions

School colors

Mascot
Before OBU was established, what is now known as "Bison Hill" was a buffalo wallow. OBU founders nominated the American Bison as a school mascot because they hoped that graduates would help meet the needs of the world as the bison met the many needs of the Native Americans. The bison was selected as the school mascot in 1918, and The Bison student newspaper was first published in December of that year.  The bison statue and pedestal on the Oval were donated by the Class of 1932.
In 1962, a student organization, known as "The Sacred Order of the Bison", brought to the campus a live bison mascot, which they named "Belshazzar". Belshazzars I, II, III, and IV lived in a pen near the fieldhouse and athletic fields and members of "The Sacred Order of the Bison" were responsible for the care of the mascot. However, in 1974, due to concerns from "The Sacred Order of the Bison" and students alike, Belshazzar IV was released from the confines of the campus pen and allowed to roam on a semi-natural ranch near Bartlesville, Oklahoma. Since 1974, Oklahoma Baptist University has had no live animal mascot. The university does have a male and a female student dress in bison mascot-animal costumes at some athletic and other special events. The newest addition to the mascot-animal costume, which previewed in the spring semester of 2013, became known as "Shaz". Students voted to name the bison mascot on the website at www.okbu.edu. The name of "Shaz" originated from a shorter form of Belshazzar, which was the original Bison mascot's name.

"Ka-rip!"
The "Ka-Rip" spirit chant was introduced by Fred McCaulley (Class of 1920) in 1918. It is repeated often and rapidly by OBU fans during sporting events, and memorization of "Ka-rip!" is an important part of OBU new student orientation.

School song
"Hymn to Alma Mater" became the official school song in 1939. Dean Warren M. Angell composed the music and Mary Ann Tisinger wrote the words.

Welcome Week, Beanies and The Walk
"Welcome Week" is OBU's program of orientation for all new students prior to the start of the fall semester. New students are given a green and gold beanie that is worn throughout welcome week, taught the Ka-rip! spirit chant and the school song, and introduced to college life. Students also engage in a "Serve Shawnee" service project. On the night before classes begin, new students participate in "The Walk" from the Oval to Raley Chapel, mirroring the walk taken on graduation day.
Beanies and the traditions concerning them have varied over the years, but the tradition of recognizing and welcoming new students to campus has been revived yearly for over 90 years. The tradition began in the 1919–1920 school year when the incoming freshmen students were the first to wear the beanies and the beanies were worn for a full year as a sign of penance. By 1925, the OBU student handbook stated that freshmen were required to wear their "Greencaps" on campus from the beginning of fall semester until Thanksgiving. In 1933, the student handbook said that freshmen were required to wear the "Greencaps" until the final home football game. At halftime of the final game, freshmen were permitted to burn their beanies. In 1968, freshmen were supposed to wear beanies between 7 o'clock a.m. and 11 o'clock p.m. while on campus during "Welcome Week". If the freshmen won the "Freshmen-Upperclassmen Tug-O-War", then they could dispose of their beanies. If they lost the contest, then they had to wear their beanies for another week.

Hanging of the Green
The "Hanging of the Green" is an OBU Christmas tradition that dates back to 1937 and is held on the first Friday in December to commemorate the holiday season. The events include a formal dinner, a musical production featuring familiar religious and secular Christmas carols, a dramatic production, honoring of senior students, and the adornment of Raley Chapel with wreaths, Christmas trees, and other Christmas ornamentation. The program has been varied through many years, but has always included Christmas greenery and honoring senior students. The first "Hanging of the Green" ceremony was held in 1937 in WMU dormitory. During that ceremony, students sang Christmas carols and hung ornamental Christmas wreaths around the building. Afterwards, the students took a candle from that ceremony to each of their respective residence halls. In 1945, the ceremony was moved to the W.L. Brittain Library and Fine Arts Center (now the Mabee Learning Center). In 1957, the ceremony was moved to the University Auditorium (now Sarkey's Telecommunications Center). With the completion of Raley Chapel in 1961, the "Hanging of the Green" moved to Potter Auditorium. 2011 will mark the fiftieth consecutive "Hanging of the Green" held in Raley Chapel's Potter Auditorium. In addition to the "Hanging of the Green", various other buildings and trees are decorated before Christmas.

Abandoned traditions
Freshmen orientation and "Welcome Week" were once unofficially known as "Freshmen Initiation". Freshmen were required to wear name tags and "Greencap", bow before upperclassmen, and memorize and recite "Bison Orientation Police", "Hymn to Alma Mater", "Ka-Rip", and a poem known as I am a lowly freshman.

The "Freshmen-Upperclassmen Tug-O-War" occurred the first week of "Freshmen Initiation". Preparations for the tug-of-war included: Watering the soil and ground where the freshmen were to stand for the contest, greasing the freshmen end of the rope, beginning the contest with upperclassmen of small stature, and gradually replacing them with much larger upperclassmen. The upperclassmen always emerged from the contest victorious.

"Freshmen Initiation", "Freshmen-Upperclassmen Tug-O-War", and "Bison Orientation Police" were eliminated in the 1980s and replaced with "Welcome Week".

Events hosted at OBU
 OBU annually hosts the OSSAA State 1A, 2A, and 3A Vocal Contest.  The majority of contest activities take place in Raley Chapel, where numerous high school choirs and ensembles warm-up and perform for contest judges.
 OBU, over the course of the past few years, has held a two-day camp in preparation for the OMEA (Oklahoma Music Educators Association) High-School All-State Chorus auditions. Usually this event takes place the second or third weekend in July.
OBU also hosts a Christian youth camp called Super Summer every year for the first three weeks of June and is attended by youth groups from everywhere in the United States.

Campus organizations
OBU recognizes more than 150 campus organizations with various interests and purposes, including student government, involvement, academics, music and arts, politics, social service, sports and religion.

Student Government Association
There are two branches of OBU's SGA: executive and legislative.
The executive branch is headed by the Student Body President. The President is elected on a ballot open to the entire student body near the end of the spring semester. Anyone who is at least a junior and has a 3.0 grade point average is eligible to run for President or Vice President (see legislative section).  The President works directly with the Board of Trustees and the University President. The SGA President also holds the power to sign bills for passage, or veto them. Along with the President is the Vice-President, who runs on the same ballot, the Speaker of the Senate, the Attorney General, and the Chief of Staff. Those three are appointed by the President and Vice-President, who are then approved by the Senate. 
The legislative branch is made up of elected senators from the student body. They hear bills and resolutions that can range from chartering official clubs on campus to allocating money for student activities.
Five Senators are elected from each class, and eight at-large Senators are also elected. Furthermore, the four Class Presidents also serve as senators, for a total of 32.
Each year, the Senate is given a budget (which is a part of the whole SGA budget), that they are vested with distributing to various campus organizations. Campus organizations and individuals petition the Senate for funds that go to various club activities and for competitions such as Model Arab League.

Campus Activities Board

Campus Activities Board (CAB) serves the university by sponsoring entertainment activities throughout the year. CAB sponsors three major talent and variety shows each academic year: Biggie, Freshmen Follies and Spring Affair. Biggie is reserved for upperclassmen, Follies for freshmen, and Spring Affair is open to all students. Acts and emcees for each show are selected through auditions. In additions, CAB also sponsors T.W.I.R.P. (The Woman is Required to Pay) Week and Christmas events including Kerr Old Fashioned Christmas, CAB/ARAmark Banquet and Kids' Christmas, and other community activities.

The Herd
The Herd is a student organization that assists in recruiting new students to OBU. The Herd takes part in events such as Fall, Winter and Spring Preview Day, Night on the Hill, Be a Bison Day, and Super Enrollment Day, along with various church and dinner events.

Notable alumni

Science
 Dr. Sunday O. Fadulu, Class of 1964. Professor of microbiology and chairman of biology, Texas Southern University; patent holder for a drug treating sickle cell anemia.
 William R. Pogue, Class of 1951, Colonel, USAF (Ret.), NASA astronaut and pilot of Skylab 4 (third and final manned visit to the Skylab orbital workshop), the longest manned flight (84 days, 1 hour and 15 minutes) in the history of manned space exploration to date.
 Dr. Ralph Faudree, Class of 1961. Provost and professor of mathematics at the University of Memphis; has an Erdős number of 1, having written over 50 papers with Paul Erdős.

Education
 Dr. Robert L. Lynn, Class of 1953. President of Louisiana Christian University 1975–1997
 Courts Redford, Class of 1920. Former President of Southwest Baptist University; Executive Secretary-Treasurer (President) Southern Baptist Home Mission Board (now SBC North American Mission Board)
 Oral Roberts, Founder and Former President of Oral Roberts University
 Dr. Winston Tabb, Sheridan Dean of University Libraries, Johns Hopkins University
 William D. Underwood, Class of 1987. President of Mercer University; former interim president of Baylor University

Media and arts
 Joel Engle, Christian recording artist and author
 Jim J. Bullock, ex 1976, American comedian, stage, television and film actor.  He has starred in Too Close for Comfort, Spaceballs and Ned's Declassified School Survival Guide.
 Bruce Fowler, opera singer
 Dennis Jernigan, Class of 1981. Christian singer-songwriter
 Jami Smith, Class of 1993. Christian singer-songwriter
Jen Hatmaker, Class of 1996. Christian author, blogger, and speaker and reality show personality
 Christy Nockels, Class of 1996. Christian singer-songwriter
Chung King-fai, Hong Kong television actor

Public officials
 Mary Fallin, Governor of Oklahoma, former Lieutenant Governor of Oklahoma. United States Representative, Oklahoma District 5 (Republican)
 Joel Hefley, Class of 1957. United States Representative, Colorado District 5, Republican
 Ralph B. Hodges, Class of 1952. Former Chief Justice of the Oklahoma Supreme Court 1965–2004
 Shane Jett, Class of 1997. Current State Senator, Oklahoma Senate. Former State Representative, Oklahoma House of Representatives
 Clark Jolley, Class of 1992. State Senator, Oklahoma Senate
 Robert S. Kerr, former United States Senator 1948–1963; former Governor of Oklahoma 1943–1947
 Debbe Leftwich, State Senator, Oklahoma Senate
 Huey Long, former United States Senator 1932–1935; former Governor of Louisiana 1928–1932
 David Lynn Russell Class of 1963, United States Federal Judge
 Kris Steele, Class of 1996. State Representative, Oklahoma House of Representatives

Sports
 Clay Martin, Class of 1999. NFL referee
 Al Tucker, pro basketball player; 1967–68 NBA All-Rookie Team

See also
 Southern Baptist Convention
 List of state and other conventions associated with the Southern Baptist Convention

References

External links
 
 Official athletics website

 
Private universities in Oklahoma
Private universities and colleges in Oklahoma
Universities and colleges affiliated with the Southern Baptist Convention
Educational institutions established in 1910
Education in Pottawatomie County, Oklahoma
Buildings and structures in Pottawatomie County, Oklahoma
1910 establishments in Oklahoma
Council for Christian Colleges and Universities